Paul Mitchell (born 20 October 1971) is an English former footballer who played as a midfielder. He later worked at AFC Bournemouth as a correspondent for Opta Sports.

References

Since 1888... The Searchable Premiership and Football League Player Database (subscription required)

1971 births
Living people
English footballers
Association football midfielders
Premier League players
AFC Bournemouth players
West Ham United F.C. players
Torquay United F.C. players
Barry Town United F.C. players
Footballers from Bournemouth